Vespers is the Catholic and Orthodox prayer service.

Vespers may also refer to:

Literature 
 "Vespers", a poem in W. H. Auden's "Horæ Canonicæ" sequence, published in The Shield of Achilles (1955)
 "Vespers", a 1990 novel by Ed McBain
 "Vespers", a poem in A. A. Milne's 1924 collection When We Were Very Young

Music 
 The Vespers, a musical group from Nashville
 Vespers (album), by saxophonist Steve Lacy
 Vespers, an alternative title of the 1915 composition All-Night Vigil by Rachmaninoff
 Vespers, a 1968 composition by Alvin Lucier

History 
As a euphemistic term for massacres of specific population groups:
 Asiatic Vespers, the killing of Romans in Asia Minor in 88 BC by Mithridates VI of Pontus
 Niçard Vespers, the three days of popular uprising of the inhabitants of Nice in 1871 in favour of the union of the County of Nice with the Kingdom of Italy
 Sicilian Vespers, the killing of the French in Sicily in 1282 by the Ghibellines
 Adana massacre, the killing of (mainly Armenian) Christians by Muslims in 1909, sometimes called the Cilician Vespers
 Jérémie Vespers, the killing of the relatives of Haitian insurgents by government forces in 1964

Other uses 
 Vespers (video game), a 2005 interactive fiction game by Jason Devlin
 Vespers, a society in The 39 Clues book series that causes evil

See also
Sicilian Vespers (disambiguation)
Vesper (disambiguation)